Giannis Andrianopoulos (Greek: Γιάννης Ανδριανόπουλος; 1900 – 6 November 1952) was a Greek footballer and one of the founding members of Greece's most successful football club, Olympiacos CFP.

Club career
Born in Piraeus, Greece, Andrianopoulos began his career at the age of 18, playing for home town club Peiraikos Syndesmos FC. Here Yiannis earned his first taste of success, winning an unofficial Greek Championship in 1923. Peiraikos Syndesmos FC merged with Peiraiki Enosis FC in January 1924 and the Athletic and Football Club of Piraeus was formed. Yiannis was part of the new team and helped them win the 1924 Athens-Piraeus championship.

Olympiacos FC
The same year around autumn, the new club split in two different squads: One team, led by the Andrianopoulos brothers and goalkeeper Kostas Klidouchakis, formed Olympiakos Omilos, which evolved into Olympiakos FC; the other, led by Kostas Ferlemis, Christos Peppas and Giorgos Hadjiandreou merged, with an independent club named "Young Boys" to form Peiraikos Omilos, which in turn evolved into Ethnikos Peiraios FC.

Following a series of mergers between other Piraeus and Athens based clubs, as well as an Athens football Championship, Andrianopoulos and his brothers went on to create Olympiacos FC in March 1925. Giannis, Georgios, Konstantinos and Vasilios, Leonidas went on to make the newly formed Piraeus Club famous throughout Greece. Two other brothers, Aristides and Stelios Andrianopoulos, were playing in other Piraeus football clubs.

Giannis Andrianopoulos was the oldest of seven brothers who, like him, would go on to become famous footballers in the Olympiacos' ranks. As a result, Yiannis and his brothers earned Olympiacos the name Thrylos meaning "Legend" in Greek, a nickname which the club carries to this day. Yiannis was certainly the brother who made the biggest impact towards the club, even becoming a player-coach; Olympiacos' first coach, from 1925 until 1927. In 1929, Yiannis retired from football, and became Olympiacos' president for 3 years.

International
Andrianopoulos played for the national side for the 1920 Olympic Games. His brother Giorgos was a member of the team too. His brothers at Olympiakos also played for Greece in 1929 and 1930.

Honours
Olympiacos First Manager
Olympic Football Tournament Final
President of Olympiacos (1929–1932)
President of E.P.S.P & Hellenic Football Federation

References

1900 births
1952 deaths
Olympiacos F.C. presidents
Olympiacos F.C. managers
Olympiacos F.C. players
Footballers from Piraeus
Footballers at the 1920 Summer Olympics
Olympic footballers of Greece
Association football midfielders
Association football forwards
Greek football managers
Greek footballers